Sex trafficking in Hong Kong is human trafficking for the purpose of sexual exploitation and slavery that occurs in Hong Kong. Hong Kong is a city of origin, destination, and transit for sexually trafficked persons.

Sex trafficking victims in the city are Hongkongers, Mainland Chinese, and foreigners. Hongkongers, primarily women and girls, have been sex trafficked out of the city to other countries in Asia and different continents. Migrants, foreign workers, people in poverty, and children are vulnerable. Victims are deceived, threatened, and forced into prostitution and unfree labour. Their documents, including passports, are often confiscated and they are  tied, locked-up, and or guarded. They experience physical and psychological trauma. They are exposed to sexually transmitted diseases from rapes, and abuse, malnutrition, and poor living conditions are common. Cybersex or online sex trafficking and victims being in pornography and live video sharing is a significant problem. Traffickers use many different internet and social media sites and apps, as well as email, to lure victims.

Sex trafficking and exploitation have permeated all levels of Hong Kong society. Sex traffickers come from all social and economic groups. A number of traffickers are members of or facilitated by criminal syndicates. Some corrupt officials have been complicit.

The scale of sex trafficking in Hong Kong is unknown because of the lack of data, the secretive nature of sex trafficking crimes, the fact that only a small minority of cases are reported to the authorities, and other factors. The government has been criticized for its insufficient anti-sex trafficking efforts and dearth of victim protections and rehabilitation services.

References 

Crime in Hong Kong
Human rights abuses in Hong Kong
Prostitution in Hong Kong
Hong Kong
Youth in Hong Kong
Women's rights in Hong Kong